Perlego is a digital online library focusing on the delivery of academic, professional and non-fiction eBooks. It is a subscription-based service that offers users unlimited access to these texts for the duration of their subscription. They have been billed as “the Spotify for Textbooks” by the Evening Standard. Perlego is based in London but is available to users worldwide.

History 

Perlego was founded in 2017 by Gauthier Van Malderen and Matthew Davis, both Belgian natives, as a response to the rising inflation of textbook prices. They sought to be able to provide an affordable alternative to the high cost of purchasing university textbooks, while helping publishers recover market share lost to piracy. Van Malderen, with an academic background in business and economics, had already founded two companies before Perlego, and Davis had extensive experience in software technology and website building.

Funding
Perlego was initially self-funded. Its pre-seed funding was derived from the profit made from Gauthier’s previous business venture – Iconic Matter.
In January 2017, Perlego raised £850,000 in a round of seed funding. This was led by angel investors from the UK, Belgium and France, with Zoopla founder Alex Chesterman and LoveFilm founder Simon Franks being notable participants.
In September 2018, Perlego raised a further £3,500,000 in a venture round led by Accelerated Digital Ventures, with further participation from its existing angel investors.
In November 2019, Perlego closed its Series A fundraising round, having raised a total of £7,000,000. The fundraising was led by Charlie Songhurst, Dedicated VC, and Thomas Leysen (Chairman of Mediahuis and Umicore), with Perlego’s existing investors all reinvesting on a pro-rata basis.
In March 2022, Perlego closed its Series B fundraising round, raising $50,000,000. The round was led by Mediahuis Ventures.

Services
Perlego’s content library currently contains over 1,000,000 titles in English, Italian, Spanish French and German, covering more than 900 separate disciplines from Aeronautics to Zoology. At the moment Perlego works with over 3,000 publishing houses who provide content for the service, including major academic publishers such as Wiley and Bloomsbury. 

The service is available on both desktop and mobile. Users are able to access titles via their browser on the former or download the app on mobile devices and tablets where it is also possible to download books for offline reading. As well as the reading functionality, Perlego also offers various learning tools - these currently consist of the ability to highlight and make notes as would be possible with a physical textbook.

Perlego partnered with the University of West London in 2022 to provide its full catalogue to all UWL students.

References 

Ebook suppliers
Ebook sources
Online companies of the United Kingdom
Textbook business
British digital libraries